is a Japanese professional sumo wrestler from Shibushi, Kagoshima. He made his professional debut in May 2007. He took the second division jūryō championship in his third tournament in the division in January 2014 and was promoted to the top makuuchi division in the following tournament. His highest rank has been maegashira 5 East. He is the older brother of fellow professional sumo wrestler Chiyoōtori, and has served as his younger brother's attendant or tsukebito.

Early life and sumo background
The future Chiyomaru was born in what is now Shibushi city in Kagoshima prefecture. During his primary and middle school years he practiced judo rather than sumo. Upon graduating from a junior high school in Shibushi, he joined Kokonoe stable.  His year and a half younger brother, Yūki, would follow him into this stable a year later.

Career
He first entered the professional sumo ring in July 2007. He slowly worked his way up the ranks, and after two years and two months in the ring his shikona (ring name) was changed to Chiyomaru following the Kokonoe stable custom of giving wrestlers a ring name that starts with Chiyo upon promotion to the sandanme division. Chiyomaru was judged by his appearance of his big, round belly when given the shikona of Chiyomaru which literally means ‘Eternally round’ in Japanese. It would take him over four years rising slowly through the lower divisions before reaching the professional ranks of jūryō. During this time, in 2011 he and his brother's family home was lost in a fire and they agreed building their parents a new house could be motivation for them to achieve more success in sumo. Chiyomaru's coach, the former Chiyonofuji remarked that before his brother overtook him he lacked motivation and disliked training, and in many ways it was being passed up by his own brother that spurred him on to improve his sumo. To add insult to injury, when Chiyomaru's younger brother became a sekitori (a salaried wrestler) and in need of an attendant, his coach chose Chiyomaru in hopes of motivating him to try harder to make the professional ranks and divest himself of this role. Chiyomaru admits that the indignity of being his own brother's attendant did motivate him and he might not have achieved promotion if this hadn't happened.

In July 2013 with a 4–3 record at makushita 1, he finally achieved promotion to jūryō for the following tournament. When he made his jūryō debut in September 2013 his brother, Chiyoōtori was already in the division, marking the 17th time in history that two brothers were in the professional ranks at the same time. He only managed a 7–8 losing record in his jūryō debut, but followed this with an impressive November tournament, winning 8 of his first 9 bouts and ending with an 11–4 record. In the January 2014 tournament, his success continued, and from the rank of jūryō 6 he logged in a 13–2 record and the championship.  Coincidentally, this was the tournament immediately after his younger brother also won the jūryō division with a 13–2 record. This was the first time in history two brothers had achieved consecutive championships.

Chiyomaru's promotion to the top makuuchi division in March 2014 followed his brother's ascension by one tournament and marked the tenth time in history two brothers had been in the highest division at the same time. At an event celebrating his promotion he expressed his incredulity at this turn of events and surmised that perhaps even the two brothers sharing the rank of ōzeki in the future was not out of the range of possibility. In his debut at this level, he defeated several makuuchi veterans and accumulated an 8–4 record on the 12th day before losing his last three bouts to end at 8–7. In the following May tournament he was promoted to maegashira 11, his highest rank to date. He struggled however, losing to a number of wrestlers he had beaten in the previous tournament and logged in only a 5–10 record. This was still enough for him to remain in the top division for the July 2014 tournament. Though he won his first five matches he started to struggle somewhat afterwards, still managing to end the tournament with an 8–7 winning record.

After the May 2015 tournament Chiyomaru fell back to the jūryō division after scoring only three wins against twelve losses. He had to withdraw partway through the September 2015 tournament (with a sprained right acromioclavicular joint) and the January 2016 tournament (due to a knee injury). After a 12 tournament absence he returned to the top division for the July 2017 tournament. In March 2018 he reached his highest rank to date of maegashira 5, but five consecutive make-koshi or losing records saw him relegated to the jūryō division after the November 2018 tournament. After two straight 10–5 records in January and March 2019 he was promoted back to the top division for the May 2019 tournament in which he got a 7–8 record and got a 5–10 record in the July tournament which saw him drop down to East juryō 1 in the following September Tournament. He ended that tournament with an 8–7 score, which was enough to ensure he was promoted back to the top division for the next tournament. In November he recorded a 9–6 score, losing to Shimanoumi on the final day preventing him from achieving double digit wins for his first time in the top division.

He withdrew from the March 2020 tournament in Osaka, held without spectators due to the coronavirus outbreak, with a fever on Day 8. He agreed to a test for the coronavirus after his temperature was recorded at above 37.5C for two straight days, although it was suspected that the cause is a skin infection. On Day 10 of the tournament, Chiyomaru's test results came back as negative for the novel coronavirus. He was demoted back to jūryō after a 4–11 record in July 2020. Along with everyone else in Kokonoe stable he was forced to miss the January 2021 tournament due to a number of positive tests for COVID-19 at his stable. He returned with a 9–6 record in March which was enough to see him promoted back to makuuchi for the May 2021 tournament. In May he produced an 8-7 performance, his first kachi-koshi in the top division since November 2019.

Fighting style
Chiyomaru relies heavily on pushing and thrusting techniques, or oshi-sumo, but is also very commonly seen winning by the hataki-komi slap down technique. His most common winning kimarite are oshi-dashi (push out), hiki-otoshi (pull down) and hataki-komi (slap down). He is at a disadvantage if his opponent manages to grab his mawashi or belt.

Away from the dohyo
Chiyomaru is known for his cherub-like looks and is popular with female sumo fans or "rikijo." In 2014, a photo of him taking a nap, which was posted on the Japan Sumo Association's official Twitter account, became an internet hit.

In March 2015 he shook hands with Derek Jeter who was visiting the Osaka tournament, but admitted not knowing who the retired Yankees star was.

Career record

See also
List of sumo tournament second division champions
Glossary of sumo terms
List of active sumo wrestlers

References

External links
 

1991 births
Living people
Japanese sumo wrestlers
Sumo people from Kagoshima Prefecture
Kokonoe stable sumo wrestlers